The Banta Shut Formation is a geologic formation in Texas. It preserves fossils dating back to the Neogene period.

See also

 List of fossiliferous stratigraphic units in Texas
 Paleontology in Texas

References
 

Geologic formations of Texas
Neogene stratigraphic units of North America